General Hale is a fictional character in the TV series, Agents of Shield. General Hale may also refer to:

Bernard Hale (British Army officer) (c. 1725–1798), British Army general
David Hale (general) (born 1945), U.S. Army brigadier general
Harry Clay Hale (1861–1946), U.S. Army major general
Irving Hale (1861–1930), U.S. Army brigadier general
John Hale (British Army officer) (1728–1806), British Army general